George Worthington (October 14, 1840 – January 7, 1908) was the second bishop of Nebraska in The Episcopal Church.

Biography
Worthington was born in Lenox, Massachusetts, and as a youth moved to New York City. He worked as a bookkeeper for his uncle and later studied at Hobart College (now part of Hobart and William Smith Colleges), graduating with a Bachelor of Arts in 1860, and awarded a Doctor of Divinity in 1876, and a Doctor of Laws in 1885. He then studied at the General Theological Seminary, graduating in 1863.

Worthington was ordained deacon in June 1863, and priest in 1865. He served as assistant at St Paul's Church in Troy, New York, and then became rector of Christ Church in Ballston Spa, New York. In 1868, he became rector of St. John's Church in Detroit. He remained there until 1885 when consecrated Bishop of Nebraska. While in Detroit he was at times the acting for the Bishop of Michigan. In 1883, he was elected as Missionary Bishop of Shanghai, however, he declined the election. Due to his heart condition, Worthington was unable to remain in the high altitude of Nebraska, and consequently moved to Pittsfield, Massachusetts, in 1890, while the diocese was administered by his coadjutor, and eventual successor, Arthur Llewllyn Williams. In May 1907, Worthington was appointed Bishop of the Convocation of Episcopal Churches in Europe, after which he moved to France.

He died suddenly in January 1908, as he was walking a street in Menton, France. His cause of death was due to heart disease. His body was identified by his wife a day later, as he had no identification papers at the time of his death.

References

1840 births
1908 deaths
American expatriates in France
Clergy from Detroit
Hobart and William Smith Colleges alumni
19th-century American Episcopalians
Episcopal bishops of Nebraska
19th-century American clergy